The Palawan soft-furred mountain rat (Palawanomys furvus) is a species of rodent in the family Muridae.  It is the only species in the genus Palawanomys.
It is found only in Palawan, Philippines, and has been recorded on Mount Mantalingajan.

References

Rats of Asia
Endemic fauna of the Philippines
Fauna of Palawan
Rodents of the Philippines
Mammals described in 1983
Taxonomy articles created by Polbot